The Slingsby T.3 Primary (a.k.a. Dagling) was a single-seat training glider produced in the 1930s by Fred Slingsby in Kirbymoorside, Yorkshire.

Design and development
During the 1920s Alexander Lippisch designed a training glider with very low performance to introduce pilots gradually to full-blown gliding. The result was a glider with a very simple structure of an open framework fuselage, with short wings attached by cables to a king post and the base of the fuselage. Lippisch's original design, the Zögling (Pupil in English)  had an all-wood fuselage but Wolf Hirth instigated a redesign of the rear fuselage using steel tubes.

History
The plans for the modified Zögling made their way via the United States to the London Gliding Club and Reginald Foster Dagnall, whose RFD company put it into production as the RFD Primary. They built 27 in 1930-31.  The type became known as the Dagling, a name formed by combining Dagnall and Zögling, which later became used informally to cover all types of primary gliders in the UK.  Fred Slingsby took over construction in 1934 and production continued up to the outbreak of World War II. The Primary should not be confused with the similar T.38 Grasshopper which was produced for the Air Training Corps in the 1950s.

Operators

Variants
Slingsby T.3 Primary
Derived from the Wolf Hirth-modified Zögling
RFD Primary Type AT
Production of the Primary by the R.F.D. Co, named Dagling from a contraction of Dagnall and Zögling.
Hawkridge Dagling
A modified Dagnall built post World War II by the Hawkridge Aircraft Co.

Specifications

See also

References
 Ellison, N.H. British Gliders and Sailplanes 1922-1970. A & C Black, 1971
 Simons, M. Slingsby Sailplanes. Airlife Publishing, 1996 -

External links

1930s British sailplanes
Glider aircraft
Primary
Parasol-wing aircraft